Bademli is a village in the Karamanlı District of Burdur Province in Turkey. Its population is 400 (2021).

References

Villages in Karamanlı District